The Philosophy of Sex: Contemporary Readings is a book edited by Raja Halwani, Alan Soble, Jacob M. Held, and Sarah Hoffman in which the authors provide philosophical analyses of different aspects of human sexuality.

Reception
The book was reviewed by Randy Cagle,
Jesse Kalin
and David Archard.
It also received short reviews by Marianne Janack (John Stewart Kennedy Professor of Philosophy, Hamilton College), Ronald de Sousa (Professor Emeritus of Philosophy, University of Toronto), Arina Pismenny (Montclair State University), James P. Sterba (University of Notre Dame), Thom Brooks (Durham University), and Timothy F. Murphy (University of Illinois College of Medicine).

Essays
1. Introduction: The Analytic Categories of the Philosophy of Sex, Alan Soble with Raja Halwani

2. Are We Having Sex Now or What?, Greta Christina

3. Sexual Perversion, Thomas Nagel

4. Plain Sex, Alan H. Goldman

5. Sex and Sexual Perversion, Robert Gray

6. Chatting Is Not Cheating, John Portmann

7. An Essay on Masturbation, Alan Soble

8. Trans 101, Talia Mae Bettcher

9. The Negotiative Theory of Gender Identity and the Limits of First-Person Authority, Burkay Ozturk

10. Bisexuality and Bisexual Marriage, Kayley Vernallis

11. Racial Sexual Desires, Raja Halwani

12. Is “Loving More” Better? The Values of Polyamory, Elizabeth Brake

13. What Is Sexual Orientation, Robin Dembroff

14. Thinking Queerly about Sex and Sexuality, Kim Q. Hall

15. LGBTQ . . . Z?, Kathy Rudy

16. Sexual Morality and the Concept of Using Another Person, Thomas A. Mappes

17. Sexual Use, Alan Soble

18. Consent and Sexual Relations, Alan Wertheimer

19. Dark Desires, Seiriol Morgan

20. The Harms of Consensual Sex, Robin West

21. Sexual Objectification, Lina Papadaki

22. Casual Sex, Promiscuity, and Objectification, Raja Halwani

23. BDSM, Shaun Miller

24. Two Views of Sexual Ethics: Promiscuity, Pedophilia, and Rape, David Benatar

25. Gifts and Duties, Alan Soble

References

External links 
 The Philosophy of Sex: Contemporary Readings
 4th edition

1980 non-fiction books
Books about the philosophy of sexuality
Edited volumes
Rowman & Littlefield books
Sexual ethics books